William Kelly (20 January 1875 – 27 December 1968) was an Australian cricketer. He played one first-class cricket match for Victoria in 1908.

Kelly played for the Richmond Cricket Club in Victorian district cricket bowling left-hand spin and he topped the clubs bowling average in three seasons. He was also described as a "punishing" batsman. After his playing career he worked in cricket administration serving as chairman of the Victorian Cricket Association and as a member of the national cricket Board of Control. In 1930 he managed the Australian Test team when it toured England and he served as a delegate for the Richmond Cricket Club until 1934.

See also
 List of Victoria first-class cricketers

References

External links
 

1875 births
1968 deaths
Australian cricketers
Victoria cricketers
Cricketers from Victoria (Australia)